Juan Carrillo is a Mexican-American politician. He serves as a Democratic member for the 39th district of the California State Assembly, which includes Palmdale, Lake Los Angeles, Adelanto, and Victorville.

Life and career 
Carrillo was born in Mexico. At the age of fifteen, he emigrated to the United States. He attended Garfield High School, College of the Desert and California State Polytechnic University.

Carrillo is a former member of the Palmdale City Council.

In June 2022, Carrillo easily defeated former state Assemblyman Steve Fox and Andrew Rosenthal in the non-partisan primary election for the 39th district of the California State Assembly. In November 2022, he defeated Paul Marsh in the general election, winning 56% of the votes. He succeeded Luz Rivas and assumed his office on December 5, 2022.

References 

American people of Mexican descent
American politicians of Mexican descent
Living people
Year of birth missing (living people)
Hispanic and Latino American state legislators in California
Place of birth missing (living people)
Democratic Party members of the California State Assembly
21st-century American politicians
Mexican emigrants to the United States
College of the Desert alumni
California State Polytechnic University, Pomona alumni